Tenina Stevens (born December 21, 1971), better known by her stage name SUGA-T, is an American rapper from Vallejo, California. She is a founding member of The Click, a rap group that also includes her brothers E-40 and D-Shot and her cousin B-Legit.

The Click released their debut album, Down and Dirty, in 1992 through E-40's Sick Wid It Records, after which all four member released solo projects, with Suga-T's debut album It's All Good being released in 1993. In 1995 Sick Wid It signed a major label distribution deal with Jive Records, Suga-T then appeared on The Click's second album, Game Related in 1995 and released her major label debut Paper Chasin', which charted on the Billboard 200 at No. 193. She also sings multi-genres of music, writes songs and is a TV, music and executive producer. Suga-T is currently working as a performer, author, speaker, vision partner coach and is the founder of Sprinkle Me Enterprise and Sprinkle Me School of Music and Vision. At one time she sacrificed her career and went back to school to complete an AA Business, BA Psychology and MA in Organizational Management, re-invented her brand and helps others re-invent their brand.

Discography

Studio albums

Collaboration albums
 Down and Dirty with The Click (1992)
 Game Related with The Click (1995)
 Money & Muscle with The Click (2001)

Compilation albums
 Gettin' It (2000)

Mixtapes
The Return of Suga-T: The Best Is Yet to Come (2010)

Extended plays
The All Woman Show (2011)
Queen of the West (2017)

Soundtrack appearances

Filmography

Film
 Obstacles (2000)
 Malibooty (2003)
 Born to Be a Gangster (2003)
 What Are the Chances? (2016)
 16 Bars (2017)

Television
 The Lyricist Lounge Show (2000)
 Unsung - Season 9 Episode 4 (2016)
 Hip Hop Honors: All Hail the Queens (2016)
 Young Grandmothers of Hip-Hop (2018)
 Young Grandmothers Club (2018)

References

External links

 Suga-T at Discogs

American women rappers
African-American women rappers
Jive Records artists
Musicians from Vallejo, California
Rappers from the San Francisco Bay Area
Living people
West Coast hip hop musicians
Gangsta rappers
21st-century American rappers
21st-century American women musicians
21st-century African-American women
21st-century African-American musicians
1971 births
21st-century women rappers